Danny Chan is a Hong Kong singer. Danny or Daniel Chan may also refer to:

 Danny Chan Kwok-kwan, Hong Kong actor
 Daniel Chan, Hong Kong singer, and actor

See also
 Danny Chen, Chinese-American soldier